Timbuk 3 was an American rock band which released six original studio albums between 1986 and 1995. They are best known for their Top 20 single "The Future's So Bright, I Gotta Wear Shades". The band's music has been featured on more than 20 compilation and soundtrack albums.

Career
Timbuk 3 was formed in 1984 in Madison, Wisconsin, by the husband and wife team of Pat MacDonald (acoustic, electric, bass and MIDI guitars, harmonica, vocals, drum programming) and Barbara K. MacDonald (electric guitar, acoustic guitar, mandolin, violin, rhythm programming, vocals). They were joined in 1991 by Wally Ingram (drums) and Courtney Audain (bass).

Timbuk 3 briefly appeared in the 1988 movie D.O.A. (starring Dennis Quaid and Meg Ryan, directed by Rocky Morton and Annabel Jankel) as a house band.  They performed the songs "Too Much Sex, Not Enough Affection" and "Life Is Hard".

Discography

Studio albums

Other albums
Some of the Best of Timbuk 3: Field Guide (1992) (greatest hits compilation)
Espace Ornano (1993) (live album)
Austin City Limits Live From Timbuk3 (2019) (live album)

Singles

See also
Grammy Award for Best New Artist
List of 1980s one-hit wonders in the United States

References

External links

Record Label website
Timbuk3 discography at Rolling Stone
Pat MacDonald's Steel Bridge Songfest project
1991 interview with Innerviews
1989 interview with Innerviews

American folk rock groups
Rock music groups from Wisconsin
Musical groups established in 1986
1986 establishments in Wisconsin
Married couples
I.R.S. Records artists